Harshavardhan Rane (born 16 December 1983) is an Indian actor, who mainly works in Telugu and Hindi films.

Early life 
Harshvardhan Rane was born on 16 December 1983 in Rajahmundry, Andhra Pradesh, India to a Telugu mother and a Maharashtrian father. He was brought up in Gwalior, Madhya Pradesh.

He worked as a freelancer in a film-branding enterprise. He wanted to be in the movies.

Career

Debut and early work (2008-2015) 
Rane made his acting debut with the Hindi television series, Left Right Left in 2008. He portrayed Cadet Rummy Gaur in the second season. Rane made his film debut with the Telugu film Thakita Thakita in 2010. He portrayed a college student opposite Haripriya. Rediff.com mentioned, "Harsh is apt for his role; He displays the earnestness and sincerity needed for the role."

He had two films in 2012. He first appeared in Naa Ishtam opposite Genelia D'Souza. He then portrayed the lead opposite Poorna in Avunu. Rediff.com noted, "Avunu works because of the acting of Poorna and Harsha. Harsha shows his brilliance towards the end." He portrayed a musician opposite Vithika Sheru in Prema Ishq Kaadhal in 2013. Times of India wrote, "Harshvardhan Rane looks every bit the brooding rock."

Rane had four releases in 2014. He first portrayed a software engineer in Anaamika opposite Nayanthara. He then portrayed a fashion designer in Maaya opposite Avantika Mishra. 123telugu stated, "Harshavardhan Rane who usually does different kind of roles, has given a matured performance in this film." Next he portrayed a software engineer opposite Anjali in Geethanjali. Rane then had a cameo role in Brother of Bommali.

In 2015, Rane reprised his role of Harsha in the sequel of Avunu titled, Avunu 2. Next, he did a cameo in Bengal Tiger, the same year.

Sanam Teri Kasam and progression (2016-present) 

Rane made his Hindi film debut with Sanam Teri Kasam. He portrayed a lawyer opposite Pakistani actress Mawra Hocane. Hindustan Times noted, "Rane as Inder, delivers a controlled and poised performance. He lights up the screen with his strong and well-chiselled physique and emotes superbly through his eyes." While News18 mentioned him as "one of the most incredible performer." He received Stardust Award for Superstar of Tomorrow – Male nomination for the film. In 2017, he did a cameo in Fidaa opposite Sai Pallavi.

Rane had two films in 2018. He first portrayed Maj. Harbhajan Singh in J P Dutta's Paltan, opposite Monica Gill. Hindustan Times said, "Harshvardhan Rane commit fully to his part with noses-flaring and eyebrows furrowing the brow." He then portrayed a kidnapper in Kavacham. Deccan Chronicle stated, "Harshavardhan Rane justifies his cameo."

In 2020, he portrayed a gangster opposite Sanjeeda Sheikh in Taish. It released as a feature film and a six episodic series. Bollywood Hungama noted, "Rane looks dashing and gives a first-rate performance." Times of India said, " Rane, as ruthless gangster Pali, is impactful with the exception of his confrontational scene with Samrat."

Rane  portrayed an adventure lover opposite Taapsee Pannu in Haseen Dillruba, a Netflix release. Firstpost stated, "Rane plays the only attention-grabbing character and delivers the film’s only memorable performance."

He had only one release in 2022. He portrayed an advocate in Tara Vs Bilal opposite Sonia Rathee.

Rane was among Times' Most Desirable Men in 2015, 2016 and 2017.

In the media 
Rane was ranked in The Times of India list of Most Desirable Men at the following times:
 No. 32 in 2016.
 No. 35 in 2017. 
 No. 33 in 2018.
 No. 31 in 2019.
 No. 29 in 2020.

Personal life and off screen work 
Rane is fluent in English, Hindi, Telugu and Marathi. He dated actress Kim Sharma from 2018 to 2019.
Reportedly, he is currently Dating His Taish Co-Star Sanjeeda Sheikh.

In 2022, Rane bought a campervan, few days before his bithday. Harshvardhan Rane becomes India's first actor to live in a campervan. He said, 

Rane owns a charity foundation holding garage sales for the ShirtOff Foundation to raise money to support the education of a girl-child (Swati) who had lost her parents to HIV. The campaign has him selling T-shirts he wore in his films at charity garage sales. He then sold his shirts in Hyderabad from his latest hit Sanam Teri Kasam and managed to single-handedly raise close to Rs Two lakhs and still counting through online sales. 

In May 2021, he sold his bike to raise oxygen concentrators for those infected by the covid virus.

Filmography

Films

Television

Accolades

References

External links

 

1983 births
Living people
Indian male film actors
Male actors in Telugu cinema
Male actors from Rajahmundry
21st-century Indian male actors
Male actors in Hindi cinema
Male actors from Madhya Pradesh
People from Gwalior
Telugu male actors
Marathi actors
Male actors in Hindi television